José Ramón Barreto (born August 2, 1991 in Caracas, Venezuela), is a Venezuelan-Ecuadorian actor and singer.

Filmography

Film

Television

References

External links 

Venezuelan male telenovela actors
Living people
21st-century Venezuelan male actors
Male actors from Caracas
1992 births